No Sex Please, We're British is a 1973 British comedy film directed by Cliff Owen, and starring Ronnie Corbett, Ian Ogilvy, Susan Penhaligon, and Arthur Lowe. It was based on the 1971 play No Sex Please, We're British, with multiple changes in the film adaptation.

Synopsis
Runnicles, a clerk in a small-town British bank (openly depicted in the film as the branch of Barclays Bank in Windsor High Street), is horrified when a package arrives containing pornography, rather than the new calculator he expected. His efforts to dispose of it, while avoiding detection, turn into a farcical series of events involving a bank inspector, the police, and a local criminal to whom the pornography actually belongs.

Cast
 Ronnie Corbett – Brian Runnicles
 Ian Ogilvy – David Hunter
 Susan Penhaligon – Penny Hunter
 Beryl Reid – Bertha Hunter
 Arthur Lowe – Mr Bromley
 Michael Bates – Mr Needham
 Cheryl Hall – Daphne Martin
 David Swift – Inspector Paul
 Deryck Guyler – Park keeper
 Valerie Leon – Susan
 Margaret Nolan – Barbara
 Gerald Sim – Reverend Mower
 John Bindon – Pete
 Stephen Greif – Niko
 Michael Robbins – Car driver
 Frank Thornton – Glass Shop Manager
 Michael Ripper – Traffic warden
 Lloyd Lamble – American man
 Mavis Villiers – American lady
 Sydney Bromley – Rag & Bone Man
 Brian Wilde – Policeman in park
 Eric Longworth – Man with Lighter
 Edward Sinclair – Postman
 Fred Griffiths as Delivery Man
 Lucy Griffiths as Spinster Lady
 Robin Askwith – Baker's delivery man

Critical reception
Writing in 1979, at the time of the American release, The New York Times reviewer commented: "In its own way, it is well done ... (with) its simple-minded and by now rather outdated double and triple entendres."

TV Guide said: "A pleasing performance from Corbett ... saves this otherwise average British farce from the usual doldrums."

References

External links

1973 films
1973 comedy films
1973 in England
British comedy films
Films about sexual repression
Films directed by Cliff Owen
Films shot at Pinewood Studios
Films set in Windsor, Berkshire
Columbia Pictures films
1970s English-language films
1970s British films